Axel Prahl (born 26 March 1960 in Eutin) is a German actor and musician.

Prahl, born in Eutin, grew up in nearby Neustadt in Holstein. After his A-levels, Prahl started studying music and mathematics, but then went on to acting school in Kiel. His acting debut came in 1994 in a television series for ZDF.

Aside from his film acting, for which he has won several accolades including two Adolf Grimme Awards, Prahl has starred in 23 episodes of the German television crime series Tatort. Prahl also co-starred in the 2009 German TV film 12 Winter with Jürgen Vogel. The cine films Nightshapes (1999) and Grill Point (2002) marked the start of a continuous successful cooperation with director Andreas Dresen which harvested some renown awards. In 2006 he won the German Film Critics Association Award as "Best Actor" for the Dresen film drama "Willenbrock".

Aside of being a popular actor he started as a sideline a music career, releasing three albums (2011, 2013 and 2018) as a singer-songwriter and bandleader. From 2007 on Prahl hosted annually the two days summer music festival Inselleuchten at Marienwerder, Brandenburg. He speaks English and Spanish quite fluently.

Axel Prahl is married and lives with his third wife in Berlin, and he has got four grown-up children, one of them an actress.

References

External links 

 

1960 births
Living people
People from Eutin
People from Ostholstein
German male television actors
German male film actors
20th-century German male actors
21st-century German male actors
German singer-songwriters
German bandleaders
Audiobook narrators